Krambambula may refer to:

 Krambambula (drink)
 Krambambula (band)